Eva Vamberger (born 15 October 1995) is a Slovenian footballer who plays as a goalkeeper for Ljubljana.

References

External links
 

1995 births
Living people
Sportspeople from Kranj
Slovenian women's footballers
Women's association football goalkeepers
FSK St. Pölten-Spratzern players
SV Neulengbach (women) players
ŽNK Olimpija Ljubljana players
ŽNK MB Tabor players
Fundación Albacete players
ŽNK Mura players
ÖFB-Frauenliga players
Primera División (women) players
Slovenia women's international footballers
Slovenian expatriate footballers
Slovenian expatriate sportspeople in Austria
Expatriate women's footballers in Austria
Slovenian expatriate sportspeople in Spain
Expatriate women's footballers in Spain